Trevor Chappell (born 6 April 1961) is an Australian local radio presenter for the Australian Broadcasting Corporation (ABC) based in Melbourne. He is currently one of the regular presenters of the Overnights program broadcast nationally from 2:00AM (AEST) to 6:00AM (or 5:30AM on some stations) on Monday, Tuesday, Wednesday and Thursday mornings. He is joined by a variety of regular guests each night.

Early life
Chappell was born on 6 April 1961 in Western Australia.

After completing high school, Chappell worked in a range of different jobs - including as a miner, wheat bins in the far north-west, and as a builder's labourer.

When he turned 21, Chappell moved to Victoria, where he studied teaching and then moved into youth work. Three years later, he enrolled in an acting course at the National Theatre, Melbourne.

After encountering difficulties pursuing a career in acting, Chappell moved back to Western Australia, choosing to study broadcasting at the Western Australian Academy of Performing Arts (WAAPA).

Career

1995–2000: Early radio career
Chappell attained his first job in radio working as a producer for 6PR in Perth, before moving back to Melbourne in 1995 in order to work as a casual producer at the ABC.

Chappell later produced programs for 774 AM Melbourne and for several Victorian regional radio stations.

2020–present: Host of Overnights

Chappell hosts the Overnights program Australia-wide on Monday to Thursday mornings (Rod Quinn hosts the program on Friday, Saturday and Sunday mornings) from 2:00 am to 6:00 am AEST (midnight to 4:00 am AWST). South Australia and Northern Territory have their feed delayed 30 minutes to enable it to be broadcast in the same local time slot.

The program features a "How, When, Where, Why" quiz on minutiae of pop culture: television, popular music, movies, comic books etc., which stimulates discussions within that framework, with only occasional excursions into real life events. Regular guests include Scott Goodings (on television). The light-hearted atmosphere evaporates for the second half of the program, when adult subjects are discussed at a mature level, with guest interviewees and talkback callers featuring heavily. An overwhelming proportion of listeners, or at least respondents who go to air, are male, many of whom identify themselves as truck drivers. The program may be heard live on the ABC's Internet service and is available to be heard online for the following seven days. Chappell has listeners in Monterrey, Mexico; Portland, Oregon; Cheung Chau, Hong Kong; Tokyo, Japan; and Denver, Colorado, Vancouver BC.
Some callers during the quiz have said that Chappell does not give clues out during the quiz; however the technical operator and second host, Michael Pavlich, has become known as a "massive clue giver".

Personal life
Chappell is married to his wife Cath. They have one son, Finn.

Interests
Chappell enjoys surfing, golf, and going to the beach.

He is known for his dislike of the Beatles and his recall of the TV shows Owly's School, F Troop and popular Perth children's TV characters Fat Cat and Percy Penguin.

He is also a huge ABBA fan, with a special fondness for Bjorn; and he is known as a consummate Lapsang Souchong tea aficionado.

Awards and nominations

ABC Local Radio Awards

! 
|-
! scope="row"| 2002
| Himself
| Best New Talent
| rowspan="4" 
| rowspan="4"| 
|-
! scope="row"| 2004
| rowspan="3"| Himself / Overnights
| rowspan="3"| Networked Program of the Year
|-
! scope="row"| 2005
|-
! scope="row"| 2006
|}

References

1961 births
ABC radio (Australia) journalists and presenters
Australian radio presenters
Living people